Lieutenant General Chenicheri Satish Nambiar  is a retired Indian general. He was the first Force Commander and Head of Mission of UNPROFOR, the United Nations Protection Force in the former Yugoslavia during 1992-93. He is the elder brother of former UN Under-Secretary-General Vijay Nambiar.

Early life 

Lt Gen Nambiar was born in Bombay (now Mumbai) on 30 August 1936, to Kunhananthan Nambiar and Chenicheri Devikutty. He was educated mostly in Poona (present-day Pune) and Bombay, and is an alumnus of St. Xavier's College, Bombay. He was an Under Officer with the National Cadet Corps, and joined the 20th regular course of the Indian Military Academy.

Military career 

During 1977-1979, Nambiar was a part of the Indian Army Training team in Iraq. During 1983-1987, he worked as a Military Adviser at the High Commission of India, London.

He also worked as the Director General of Military Operations in India. He was the first Force Commander and Head of Mission of the United Nations forces in Yugoslavia. He retired as the Deputy Chief of the Army Staff (India) in 1994.

After retirement 

After his retirement, Nambiar worked as a researcher and author on topics related to war, defence strategy and international relations. He served on the United Nations High Level Panel on "Threats, Challenges and Change", which provided basis for the UN Secretary General's report to the 2005 World Summit. Since 2011, he is a distinguished fellow of the Institute for Defence Studies and Analyses, New Delhi.

Awards 

 Vir Chakra, for Operation Cactus-Lilly (1971)
 Padma Bhushan, 2009

Military Decorations

Bibliography

References

External links 
 Satish Nambiar on BBC Hardtalk

1936 births
Living people
Indian generals
Recipients of the Padma Bhushan in other fields
Recipients of the Vir Chakra
Malayali people
Military personnel from Mumbai